Bupleurum rotundifolium, hare's ear or hound's ear, is a species of flowering plant in the genus Bupleurum, native to Morocco, Algeria, southern, central and eastern Europe, Turkey, Iran, Turkmenistan, and Kyrgyzstan. Successful in disturbed areas, it is now an established weed in the eastern United States, and in South Africa, and is introduced elsewhere.

References

Bupleurum rotundifolium
Plants described in 1753